The Old Lucerne Historic Residential District (also known as Townsite of Lucerne) is a U.S. historic district (designated as such on June 4, 2001) located in Lake Worth Beach, Florida. The district runs roughly along North Lakeside Drive, North Palmway Street, and North O Street, from Lake Avenue to 7th Avenue N. It contains 218 historic buildings.

References

External links
 Palm Beach County listings at National Register of Historic Places
 National Register of Historic Places Original Registration Form listing Contributing properties
 City of Lake Worth Beach, Florida, Map of Historic Districts
 City of Lake Worth Beach, Florida, Historic Preservation

Buildings and structures in Lake Worth Beach, Florida
Historic districts on the National Register of Historic Places in Florida
National Register of Historic Places in Palm Beach County, Florida